Janina Maria Irizarry Nazario (or simply Janina) is a Puerto Rican singer and actress more known for being the winner of the first season of Objetivo Fama, a singing talent contest held in Puerto Rico. Janina has also hosted several television shows on the island.  She is a member of the first sorority of Puerto Rico, the Mu Alpha Phi sorority.

Background

Rising star

Janina Irizarry Nazario was born in San Germán, P.R.  When she was a little girl, her family settled in Lajas.  It was in this town where she grew up, why this is considered "Lajeña".  Her artistic vocation surfaced during her childhood, which led her parents to lead it in the musical art.  At the age of nine formally began her education in this discipline, taking singing lessons and piano.  As usual in these cases, the basis of education she received was the classic genre.  But, the rock influence was very strong in her; above all, the bands Led Zeppelin, Pink Floyd, No Doubt, Journey and veteran vocalist Lana Turner.

Teen success
From her early teens, Janina was frequent participant in talent contests and artistic events at the student.  In 2000, counting the time 17 years, represented Puerto Rico at a convention and competition for amateur artists called "Connections", which was held in the U.S. state of Florida.  The fate led her in that contest, she won the First Prize.

After completing her degrees she joined the Inter-American University campus of San Germán, Puerto Rico, where she continued her musical studies.  During the four years she spent in this room formed part of the rock group No Mistake, against whom she had opportunity to perform at festivals and nightclubs in many cities, including San Juan.

Music career

Objetivo Fama

Janina, was the winner of Objetivo Fama on it first season. Arguably, the experience gained over that period was decisive in their performance on "Objetivo Fama" because since her first appearance before the cameras was established as a solid favorite to beat other competitors, as it did. This, plus other valuable prizes, earned her a contract as an exclusive artist of Univision Music Group. Now she is currently managed by Promotores Latinos

"Todo de Mí", "Contra la Corriente" and "Janina"

Its launch passes through the album "Todo De Mí" published on March 22, 2005.  In this production, directed by Eduardo Reyes,
release her first two singles: "Porque Tu No Estas” – versions in ballad and salsa – and "No Me Arrepiento".  Thanks to the reception that the public has lent it, Janina had the opportunity to travel to major U.S. Hispanic spots for art events and performances in television programs.

On September 26, 2006 released their second album: "Contra La Corriente", which led the Mexican music producer Armando Avila, a member of the legendary band rockin Los Babys.  Almost immediately, release the success of the title, a pop ballad composed by Myshkin Boyz, Angel Francisco Reyero and Avila.  This also provided the compositions at the end, "Al final", "Armas Blancas", "Es Posible", "Siento" y "Ven por favor".

On January 27, 2009, she released a new song "Ya No Más", being the first single of her new album titled Janina, but on May 19, 2009, she released Ya No Más Remixes by digital download. Then on September 15, 2009, Janina release a single called "Fantasma" a covered version of the song "Alone".

"La Tormenta"
In January 2018, Janina posted a video on social media with the Puerto Rican singer Jose Alfredo, revealing that she was recording a collaboration with him named "La Tormenta". This song is included in the third studio album of the singer named "TRES". Jose Alfredo & Janina know each other since 2004, when Jose Alfredo was the president of Janina's fan club.

Acting career
Janina has started in two Latin films: the popular comedy, Mi Verano Con Amanda 2 and the critically acclaimed Ernesto Alemany film, La Gunguna. La Gunguna is the story of a small .22 caliber pistol with a long history. La Gunguna travels through the darkness of the Caribbean underworld as its own character, leaving in its wake series of misfortune and disgraceful acts.

Personal life
In summer of 2013, Janina got engaged to international Brazilian model and actor, Tiago Riani.  There are now married and living in Los Angeles, California.

Discography

Studio albums
 2005: Todo De Mí
 2006: Contra La Corriente
 2009: Janina

Other albums
 2004: En La Voz De Sus Estrellas
 2004: Una Navidad con Todos
 2008: Voces De Navidad

Filmography
 2011: Mi Verano Con Amanda 2
 2015: La Gunguna

See also
 Objetivo Fama
 Anaís
 Marlon Fernández

References

1983 births
Living people
People from San Germán, Puerto Rico
21st-century Puerto Rican women singers